The Huang-Ming Zuxun (Instructions of the Ancestor of the August Ming) were admonitions left by the Hongwu Emperor Zhu Yuanzhang, the founder of the Chinese Ming dynasty, to his descendants. The text was composed in 1373 under the title Record of the Ancestor's Instructions; this was changed to Huang Ming Zu Xun during the publication of the 1395 edition.

The book was divided into thirteen sections:
 Preface (Zhēnjiè)
 Harem (Chíshǒu)
 Ritual Observance (Yán Jìsì)
 Risk management (Jǐn Chūrù)
 National Policy (Shèn Guózhèng)
 Protocol (Lǐyí)
 Legislation (Fǎlǜ)
 The Inner Chambers (Nèilìng)
 Eunuch (Nèiguān)
 Administration (Zhízhì)
 Guards (Bīngwèi)
 Public Works (Yíngshàn)
 Public Funds (Gōngyòng)

The Preface, composed by Zhu Yuanzhang himself, admonishes his descendants to exert a strict legalist government. The work pins the survival on the dynasty principally upon personal austerity and watchfulness both over practical administration of the empire, the niceties of ritual and etiquette on various occasions, and various potential traitors including their relatives, spouses, and officials both military and civil.

Sources

1370s books
Ming dynasty literature
Constitution of China